The 2019 Players Championship (officially the 2019 Coral Players Championship) was a professional snooker tournament that took place from 4–10 March 2019 in Preston, Lancashire, England. It was the sixteenth ranking event of the 2018/2019 season and a part of the newly created Coral Cup.

Ronnie O'Sullivan successfully defended his 2018 title by defeating Neil Robertson 10–4 in the final. This was O'Sullivan's 35th ranking title, one away from Stephen Hendry's record of 36 ranking titles. O'Sullivan made 3 centuries during the final, including one in the final match-winning frame; this was his 1,000th century break in competitive play, becoming the first player ever to reach that mark.

Prize fund
The breakdown of prize money for this year is shown below:

 Winner: £125,000
 Runner-up: £50,000
 Semi-final: £30,000
 Quarter-final: £15,000
 Last 16: £10,000

 Highest break: £5,000
 Total: £380,000

The "rolling 147 prize" for a maximum break: £5,000

Seeding list
The seedings were conducted on the basis of the one-year ranking list up to and including the 2019 Snooker Shoot Out.

Main draw
The following shows the full results for the tournament. Players listed in bold denote match winners.

Final

Century breaks
Total: 24

 140, 120, 107, 101  Neil Robertson
 134, 116, 116, 106, 105, 101  Ronnie O'Sullivan
 131, 118  Mark Williams
 121, 110  Jack Lisowski
 121  Mark Selby
 115, 113, 106, 105, 104, 100  Judd Trump
 110, 104  Barry Hawkins
 108  Mark Allen

References

2019
Players Championship
2019 in snooker
2019 in English sport
Sport in Preston
Snooker competitions in England
Players Championship (snooker)